Eight ships of the French Navy have borne the name Pluton in honour of the Roman god Pluto.

Ships named Pluton 
 , a 74-gun ship of the line built at Cherbourg in 1778 which fought at the Battle of the Saintes in the American War of Independence and was renamed Dugommier in 1797.
 , a 74-gun ship of the line launched at Toulon in 1805 which took part in the Battle of Trafalgar under captain Julien Cosmao.
  , a ship of the line was renamed Pluton from 1866 to 1873.
  (1839–1854), a wheeled corvette.
  (1810—1873), a 74-gun Téméraire-class ship of the line, bore the name as a prison hulk.
  (1910–1923), a minelayer
  (1927–1939), a  minelayer cruiser
 , a combat diver ship which supports the Naval Commandos.

See also 
 
 Pluto (1801), a privateer cutter

Notes and references
References

Bibliography
 

Further reading
 

French Navy ship names